Tsukong is a Loloish language of Yunnan, China. It is closely related to the Coong language of northwestern Vietnam. Tsukong speakers are found in Xishuangbanna Prefecture.

Phonology 
The following phonemes are reported in Udomkool (2006).

Tsukong has twenty-four consonants /p pʰ b m w t tʰ s ts d n l ʃ c cʰ ɲ j k kʰ x g ŋ ʔ h/, 9 vowels /i e æ a ɨ ə u o ɔ/, and 3 diphthongs /əi iu ui/.

Tsukong has a three-tone system. The tones are 35 (mid-rising), 33 (mid), and 31 (mid-falling).

References

 Udomkool, Kitjapol. 2006. A phonological comparison of selected Bisoid varieties. M.A. dissertation. Chiang Mai: Payap University.

Southern Loloish languages
Languages of Yunnan